Abu'l-Asha'ir Ahmad ibn Nasr (died 2 November 906) was a military commander for the Abbasid Caliphate and the governor of Tarsus from March 903 to August 905.

Life
Abu'l-Asha'ir was appointed to the post of governor (wali or amir) of Tarsus and of the Cilician border zone (ath-thughur ash-Shamiya) with the Byzantine Empire on 22 March 903, succeeding Muzaffar ibn Hajj. He set out from Baghdad on 12 May in direction of the border, accompanied by troops as well as by gifts from Caliph al-Muktafi to the Byzantine emperor Leo VI the Wise.

In late summer or autumn of 904, he mediated for the conclusion of a truce and a prisoner exchange with the Byzantines, to take place in the next year. In the meantime, however, the Byzantine general Andronikos Doukas invaded Arab territory and sacked Marash (Germanikeia), leading to Abu'l-Asha'ir's dismissal and replacement by Rustam ibn Baradu.

In 906 Abu'l-Asha'ir was killed when his pilgrimage caravan was attacked by Qarmatians at al-Aqaba along the Mecca Road.

References

Sources
 

 

9th-century births
906 deaths
Abbasid governors of Tarsus
Abbasid people of the Arab–Byzantine wars
9th-century Arabs
10th-century Arabs